Alfredo Baquerizo Moreno (28 September 1859, in Guayaquil – 20 March 1951) was an Ecuadorian politician. He served as Vice President of Ecuador of Leónidas Plaza and Lizardo García from 1903 to 1906 and as President of Ecuador three times in August – September 1912, September 1916 – August 1920 and October 1931 – August 1932. He was President of the Senate from 1912 to 1915, and in 1930. He was a member of the Ecuadorian Radical Liberal Party.

His administration was also considered a factor in the public disenchantment that led to the July Revolution of July 9, 1925.

References

External links
 Official Website of the Ecuadorian Government about the country President's History

1859 births
1951 deaths
People from Guayaquil
Ecuadorian people of Spanish descent
Ecuadorian Radical Liberal Party politicians
Presidents of Ecuador
Vice presidents of Ecuador
Presidents of the Senate of Ecuador